The 2022 Nationale 1 season was the 55th season of the Nationale 1 (NM1), the top-tier basketball league in Senegal.

DUC were the defending champions, having won the 2021 season. The champions of this season qualified directly for the 2023 BAL season.

AS Douanes won its 10th national title, after defeating DUC in the finals. It was the fourth season in a row that the two teams met in the finals.

Teams 
ISEG Sports left the league, while US Parcelles Assainie (USPA) joined the league.

Regular season 
Standings at the ending of the regular season.

Poule A

Poule B 

 1 AS Douanes and SLBC played one game less.

Playoffs 
The playoffs began on 16 July and ended 15 October 2022.

Finals

Play-down

The play-down is played in a round-robin format.

References 

Nationale 1 (Senegal)
2021–22 in African basketball leagues